William E. Wheeler House is a historic home located at Portville in Cattaraugus County, New York. It is a -story Stick-style wood-frame dwelling built in 1880.  Also on the property is a contributing carriage house.

It was listed on the National Register of Historic Places in 2002.

Gallery

References

Houses on the National Register of Historic Places in New York (state)
Queen Anne architecture in New York (state)
Houses completed in 1880
Houses in Cattaraugus County, New York
National Register of Historic Places in Cattaraugus County, New York